Gulnara Maksutovna Fattakhetdinova (born 13 October 1982) is a former Russian tennis player.

In her career, Fattakhetdinova won two singles and eleven doubles titles on the ITF Women's Circuit. Her career-high ranking is world No. 246, achieved on 12 July 2004, and her highest ranking in doubles was No. 102 on 6 October 2003.

After retiring from the professional tour, she became a beach tennis player.

Career
Fattakhetdinova made her WTA Tour main-draw debut at the 2003 Kremlin Cup, in the doubles event partnering Galina Fokina.

In June 2002, she made her WTA Tour main-draw singles debut at the Tashkent Open, where she run through qualification. In the doubles main draw, Fattakhetdinova partnered Ekaterina Kozhokina and the duo lost in the semifinals. They were beaten 6–4, 6–3 by Tatiana Perebiynis and Tatiana Poutchek.

ITF Circuit finals

Singles: 7 (2 titles, 5 runner-ups)

Doubles (11 titles, 11 runner-ups)

References

External links
 
 

1982 births
Living people
Tennis players from Moscow
Russian female tennis players
Universiade medalists in tennis
Universiade gold medalists for Russia
Medalists at the 2003 Summer Universiade
Tatar people of Russia
21st-century Russian women
20th-century Russian women